The Civil Movement, abbreviated to CM, is a centre-right political party in Hungary, led by Mária Seres. It has a third way ideology. The party run in the 2014 parliamentary election under the banner Alliance of Mária Seres, abbreviated to SMS.

Background
In the Summer of 2008 Mária Seres initiated a referendum drive on MPs’ expenses garners. At least 525,000 verified signatures have been collected, far more than the mandatory 200,000, in support of a referendum on MPs’ expenses, National Election Office head Emília Rytkó announced on 19 March 2009. Seres told reporters later that day, this is the first time that an individual managed to collect so many signatures for a referendum.

Election results
During the 2010 Hungarian parliamentary election six parties have gained the right to set up a national list, as the Civil Movement has joined the five parties announced earlier by the National Election Office (OVI). The CM gained prominence by gathering signatures for a referendum on curtailing MPs’ expense accounts. The party was able to register seven regional lists.

For the Hungarian Parliament:

For the European Parliament:

Footnotes

External links
 Official web site

2009 establishments in Hungary
Political parties in Hungary
Political parties established in 2009
Centrist parties in Hungary